WMTM (1300 AM) is a Christian radio station broadcasting a Southern Gospel format. It is licensed to Moultrie, Georgia, United States. The station is currently owned by Colquitt Broadcasting Company, LLC and features programming from ABC Radio and CNN Radio.

History
On June 3, 1953, the Federal Communications Commission awarded Norris B. Mills and Douglas J. Turner, doing business as the Colquitt Broadcasting Company, a construction permit for a new 1,000-watt, daytime-only station at Moultrie. The station signed on that November and increased power to 5,000 watts in November 1954. WMTM-FM 93.9 was added on November 17, 1964; five years later, Turner bought out Mills's stake in the station. The station aired primarily country music with some contemporary hit radio programming.

Douglas Turner died in 2000. After Doug's son Donnie died in 1996, Donnie's son Jim took over operations.

References

External links

Radio stations established in 1953
1953 establishments in Georgia (U.S. state)
MTM
Southern Gospel radio stations in the United States